Dawid Pietrzkiewicz (born February 9, 1988) is a Polish professional footballer who plays for Sandecja Nowy Sącz as a goalkeeper.

Career

Club
In September 2010, he was loaned to NK Primorje. He made his debut in Gambrinus liga for FC Baník Ostrava on 30 April 2011.
In the summer of 2012, Pietrzkiewicz joined Azerbaijan Premier League side Simurq. In his only season with the club he featured in all bar 4 games for Simurq, making 31 appearances.

Gabala
On the 5 June 2013 Pietrzkiewicz was unveiled as a new signing for Gabala, moving from fellow Azerbaijan Premier League Simurq on a 1-year contract with the option of a second year.  Pietrzkiewicz made his Gabala debut on 2 August 2013 in their 2-1 away victory over Baku. Pietrzkiewicz left Gabala at the end of his one-year contract, having made 10 appearances for the club. After being without a club for a year, Pietrzkiewicz re-signed for Gabala on 28 July 2015.

Sandecja Nowy Sącz
On 22 August 2017 he signed a contract with Sandecja Nowy Sącz.

Stal Stalowa Wola
Dawid Pietrzkiewicz played 14 matches for Stal Stalowa Wola in the 2019–20 II liga season. On August 10, 2020, his contract was terminated.

International
He was a part of Poland national under-19 football team.

Career statistics

References

External links
  
 

Living people
1988 births
Polish footballers
Polish expatriate footballers
Poland youth international footballers
Association football goalkeepers
Polonia Warsaw players
NK Primorje players
FC Baník Ostrava players
Simurq PIK players
Gabala FC players
Sandecja Nowy Sącz players
Raków Częstochowa players
Stal Stalowa Wola players
Czech First League players
Azerbaijan Premier League players
Ekstraklasa players
I liga players
II liga players
Slovenian PrvaLiga players
People from Sanok
Expatriate footballers in the Czech Republic
Expatriate footballers in Azerbaijan
Expatriate footballers in Slovenia
Polish expatriate sportspeople in the Czech Republic
Polish expatriate sportspeople in Azerbaijan
Polish expatriate sportspeople in Slovenia